Oscar Adrián Ahumada (born 31 August 1982) is a former Argentine football midfielder.

Club career
Born in Zárate, Buenos Aires, Ahumada made his professional debut with Club Atlético River Plate on 24 November 2002, in a 2–1 victory against Olimpo de Bahía Blanca. He played a small part in helping River to the Clausura 2003 and 2004 championships before moving to Germany in 2004 for a short spell with VfL Wolfsburg, where he joined compatriots Facundo Quiroga, Andrés D'Alessandro, Juan Carlos Menseguez and Diego Klimowicz.

However, in January 2005, Ahumada returned to River. In May 2008, he got involved in a dispute with River Plate supporters, after stating that "we lost because of the lack of support from our fans, they are not like the Boca fans." This altercation began after the elimination at the hands of fellow league side San Lorenzo de Almagro in the 2008 Libertadores Cup round of 16. Outraged River Plate fans wanted him to be sacked from the team, while club coach Diego Simeone warned Ahumada, but stated he would continue to include the player on the team. During the whole crisis after the Libertadores elimination, River Plate still had strong chances of winning the Clausura, and battled head-to-head with Estudiantes de La Plata and eventually won, with Ahumada playing a key role along with Ariel Ortega, Juan Pablo Carrizo and young prospect Diego Buonanotte.

In 2012, he signed for All Boys, which would be his last club.

International career
Ahumada was part of the Argentina squad that won the 2001 FIFA World Youth Championship on home soil.

Honours

References

External links
 
 Guardian statistics
 Argentine League statistics at Fútbol XXI  
 

1982 births
Living people
People from Zárate, Buenos Aires
Sportspeople from Buenos Aires Province
Argentine Primera División players
Club Atlético River Plate footballers
Bundesliga players
VfL Wolfsburg players
Expatriate footballers in Mexico
Expatriate footballers in Germany
Expatriate footballers in Russia
Argentine expatriate footballers
Argentine footballers
Association football midfielders
Argentine expatriate sportspeople in Germany
Argentine expatriate sportspeople in Mexico
Argentine expatriate sportspeople in Russia
Russian Premier League players
FC Rostov players
All Boys footballers
Argentina international footballers
Argentina under-20 international footballers